Drifters is a 2015 Swedish crime film directed by Peter Grönlund. It won five awards at the 51st Guldbagge Awards.

Cast
 Malin Levanon as Minna
 Lo Kauppi as Katja
 Tomasz Neuman as Boris
 Jan Mattson as Christer Korsbäck
 Niklas Björklund as Benneth
 Nadya Sundberg Solander as Carina
 Kicki Ferdinandsson as Mette
 Kalled Mustonen as Tonni

References

External links
 

2015 films
2015 crime films
Swedish crime films
2010s Swedish-language films
2010s Swedish films